Clinotaenia is a genus of tephritid  or fruit flies in the family Tephritidae.

Species
Clinotaenia anastrephina Bezzi, 1920
Clinotaenia atlas Munro, 1957
Clinotaenia cedarensis Munro, 1933
Clinotaenia grata (Wiedemann, 1830)
Clinotaenia inyanga Hancock, 1985

References

Dacinae
Tephritidae genera